Beanpole may refer to:

 Beanpole (film), a 2019 film directed by Kantemir Balagov
 Bean Pole International, a South Korean fashion brand
 Trellis (architecture), an upright structure to support plants
 Beanpole, a character played by Australian TV personality Dick McCann
 Jean-Paul Deliet, nicknamed Beanpole, a fictional character in the Tripods novels by John Christopher

See also
 Pole bean